"Si No Te Hubiera Conocido" is a song by American recording artist Christina Aguilera and Puerto Rican singer Luis Fonsi. It was written and produced by Rudy Pérez for Aguilera's second studio album Mi Reflejo (2000). The song portrays two lovers who remember each other and cannot imagine their lives if they had not known each other.  "Si No Te Hubiera Conocido" received mixed reviews from music critics for its ballad production. The song peaked at number 36 on the Billboard Hot Latin Songs chart in the United States.

Background

According to her manager Steve Kurtz, Aguilera expressed interest in recording a Spanish-language album before she recorded her debut studio album Christina Aguilera. Producer Rudy Pérez was approached during the recording sessions of the album and produced a number of tracks, including "Si No Te Hubiera Conocido", which he wrote.

"Si No Te Hubiera Conocido" is a Latin ballad featuring Puerto Rican singer Luis Fonsi. Aguilera wanted Fonsi to perform a duet with her because she felt that she could relate to him as they "grew up listening to the same things". "I was taken with his vocal ability, talent, and charm", she said. The ballad tells the story of two happy lovers that cannot envision their lives if they had not met each other.

Reception
On the review of album, an editor for Billboard magazine wrote that "listener will enjoy while listening to" the song. David Browne, writing for Entertainment Weekly provided an ironic review, commenting that Fonsi has "a nice voice, but he didn't get in [her] way." Orlando Sentinel editor Perry Gettelman was not impressed along with "El Beso del Final" and "Pero Me Acuerdo de Ti", writing that "She seems equally fond of acrobatic trills and low, sex-kittenish moans" which Parry referred to them as "ballands". Kurt B. Reighley Wall of Sound called "Si No Te Hubiera Conocido" a "sweet, syrupy duet" and stated that it "starts out charming enough but eventually devolves into the International Shouting Contest." In the United States, "Si No Te Hubiera Conoci" peaked at number 36 on the Billboard Hot Latin Songs and 22 on the Latin Pop Songs charts.

Charts

References

2000 songs
2000s ballads
Christina Aguilera songs
Luis Fonsi songs
Latin ballads
Spanish-language songs
Songs written by Rudy Pérez
Male–female vocal duets
Song recordings produced by Rudy Pérez